Ana Cecilia Reyes (born 1974) is an American lawyer from Washington, D.C., who is serving as a United States district judge of the United States District Court for the District of Columbia.

Early life and education 

Reyes was born in 1974 in Uruguay and moved to Spain soon thereafter; she immigrated to Louisville, Kentucky, as a child. After her arrival in the United States, her first-grade teacher helped her learn English.

Reyes received a Bachelor of Science, summa cum laude, from Transylvania University in 1996, a Juris Doctor, magna cum laude, from Harvard Law School in 2000, and a Masters in International Public Policy from the Johns Hopkins School of International Studies, with honors, in 2014.

Career 

Reyes deferred attendance at law school for one year to first work for Feminist Majority on an unsuccessful California drive to defeat the 1996 California Proposition 209, which sought to prohibit state governmental institutions from considering race, sex, or ethnicity, specifically in the areas of public employment, public contracting, and public education.

After law school, from 2000 to 2001, Reyes served as a law clerk for Judge Amalya Kearse of the United States Court of Appeals for the Second Circuit. Since 2001, she has worked in the law office of Williams & Connolly in Washington, D.C.; she was an associate from 2001 to 2009, and elevated to partner in 2009. Reyes focuses on cross-border legal issues and international arbitration, while also taking on pro bono work to represent asylum seekers and refugee organizations.

The Women's Bar Association of the District of Columbia named her "Woman Lawyer of the Year" in 2017. In September 2021, Chief Judge Beryl A. Howell asked Reyes to serve as the Chair of the Magistrate Judge Merit Selection Panel.

Notable cases 

In 2008, on behalf of the Center for Gender and Refugee Studies, Reyes filed a brief in support of three Guinean women seeking asylum in the U.S.

In 2018, Reyes was part of the legal team challenging the Trump Administration's restrictions on refugees entering the United States through ports of entry.

Reyes has worked on a number of international disputes. In 2021, Reyes represented Spain in a dispute over the withdrawal of economic incentives for renewable projects.

Federal judicial service 

On April 27, 2022, President Joe Biden announced his intent to nominate Reyes to serve as a United States district judge of the United States District Court for the District of Columbia. On May 19, 2022, her nomination was sent to the Senate. President Biden nominated Reyes to the seat to be vacated by Judge Colleen Kollar-Kotelly, who will assume senior status upon confirmation of a successor. A hearing on her nomination was held before the Senate Judiciary Committee on June 22, 2022. On August 4, 2022, her nomination reported out of committee by a 11–9–2 vote. On January 3, 2023, her nomination was returned to the President under Rule XXXI, Paragraph 6 of the United States Senate; she was renominated later the same day. On February 2, 2023, her nomination was reported out of committee by an 11–9 vote. On February 15, 2023, the Senate invoked cloture on her nomination by a 52–47 vote. Later that day, her nomination was confirmed by a 51–47 vote. She received her judicial commission on February 21, 2023. She become the first Hispanic woman and openly LGBTQ person to serve as a district court judge in Washington, D.C.

Selected publications

References

External links 

1974 births
Living people
20th-century American women lawyers
20th-century American lawyers
21st-century American women judges
21st-century American judges
21st-century American women lawyers
21st-century American lawyers
Harvard Law School alumni
Hispanic and Latino American lawyers
Hispanic and Latino American judges
Judges of the United States District Court for the District of Columbia
Lawyers from Washington, D.C.
Paul H. Nitze School of Advanced International Studies alumni
People from Montevideo
Transylvania University alumni
United States district court judges appointed by Joe Biden